Waltensburg/Vuorz railway station is a station on the Reichenau-Tamins–Disentis/Mustér railway of the Rhaetian Railway in the Swiss canton of Graubünden. It serves the village of Waltensburg/Vuorz in the municipality of Breil/Brigels.

Services
The following services stop at Waltensburg/Vuorz:

References

External links 
 
 

Breil/Brigels
Railway stations in Graubünden
Rhaetian Railway stations
Railway stations in Switzerland opened in 1912